The Emery School is an historic former school building at 116 Hill Street in Biddeford, Maine.  Built in 1912-13 to a design by Miller & Mayo of Portland, it is historically significant for its role the city's education, and architecturally as a fine example of a "modern" elementary school building of the period. It was listed on the National Register of Historic Places on November 18, 2011.  The building has been converted to residential housing units.

Description and history
The former Emery School building is located south of Biddeford's main business district, on a lot bounded by Hill, Birch, and Summer Streets.  It is a two-story brick structure, trimmed in cast stone and granite, facing south toward Birch Street, separated by a paved parking area.  The main facade is symmetrically arranged, nine bays wide, with two slightly-projecting entrance pavilions set one bay in from the ends.  These pavilions are framed by rusticated brick pilasters with a stone cartouche at the top of the second floor.  The entrances are set in cast stone surrounds consisting of pilasters supporting a modillioned cornice supported by scrolled brackets.  Belt courses of stone demarcate the floors, and the cornice of the main hipped roof is of pressed metal.

The Emery School was built in 1912-13 as part of a drive by the city to modernize its school facilities.  Designed in the Colonial Revival style by the Portland firm of Miller & Mayo, it adhered to guidelines published by the state in 1904 for the required properties of elementary school buildings, which included detailed prescriptions for the use of materials and layout and size of classrooms, and replaced four smaller elementary schools.  The school was used by the city until 1993, and served until 2007 as a childhood development center operated by a local Catholic church.  The building has since been converted into residences.

See also
National Register of Historic Places listings in York County, Maine

References

School buildings on the National Register of Historic Places in Maine
School buildings completed in 1913
Schools in York County, Maine
Education in Biddeford, Maine
Buildings and structures in Biddeford, Maine
1913 establishments in Maine
National Register of Historic Places in York County, Maine